This is the list of the top 50 albums of 2005 in New Zealand.

Chart

Key
 – Album of New Zealand origin

2005 in New Zealand music
2005 record charts
Albums 2005